This is a list of all stations of the Ahmedabad Metro, a rapid transit system serving Ahmedabad, India.

Ahmedabad Metro is the 12th metro system in India.

It was built and is operated by the Gujarat Metro Rail Corporation Limited. Its first section was inaugurated on 4 March 2019 and opened to the public on 6 March 2019, with the East-West Corridor. The 1.4 km-long Thaltej-Thaltej Gam section and three metro stations will be completed by January-March 2023. The rest of the Phase-1 was inaugurated on 30 September 2022. The East-West corridor and the North-South corridor were opened to public on 2 October 2022 and 6 October 2022 respectively.

Metro stations 

The list gives only operational stations, alphabetically-

Statistics

See also

References 

Ahmedabad
Ahmedabad Metro
Ahmedabad-related lists